is a Swedish-style village in Tōbetsu, Hokkaidō in Japan.

The style of the houses are Falu red wooden houses. The idea of a Swedish-styled village came when a Swedish ambassador visited the nearby town center of Tobetsu and thought that the climate was quite similar to the Swedish climate. Construction of the village started in 1984. The Swedish holiday of the Midsummer festival is one of the traditions that’s celebrated annually in the town, for this the residents dress up and wear traditional Swedish clothes. There is also a Swedish "Kräftskiva" (crayfish party) in August.

A golf club, Sweden Hills Golf Club, is nearby.

See also
Bullerby Syndrome
Suecophile

References

External links
Sweden Hills (Japanese)
Midsummer in Sweden Hills (Swedish)
There's a Town in Japan That Looks Exactly Like Sweden

Planned communities
Japan–Sweden relations
Swedish culture